Curtis McKenzie (born February 22, 1991) is a Canadian professional ice hockey forward. He is currently playing with the Texas Stars of the American Hockey League (AHL). McKenzie was selected by the Dallas Stars in the 6th round (159th overall) of the 2009 NHL Entry Draft.

Playing career
McKenzie played four seasons of NCAA Division I college hockey for the Miami RedHawks of the CCHA. In 158 career NCAA games he registered 29 goals, 51 assists, and 285 penalty minutes.

Following his senior year at Miami University, on April 12, 2013, the Dallas Stars of the National Hockey League (NHL) signed McKenzie to a two-year entry-level contract beginning with the 2013–14 AHL season, but he made his professional debut near the end of the 2012–13 season with their AHL affiliate, the Texas Stars, on an amateur tryout contract.

In the early stages of the 2014–15 season, McKenzie made his NHL debut with the Dallas Stars on October 18, 2014 against the Philadelphia Flyers. He scored his first career goal on November 16, 2014, against Corey Crawford of the Chicago Blackhawks. McKenzie signed a two-year contract extension with the Stars on July 1, 2015.

On March 10, 2017, McKenzie re-signed a one year contract to stay with the Stars organization. He played most of the year with the Texas Stars where he was named captain.

After five seasons within the Stars organization following the 2017–18 campaign, McKenzie left as a free agent and agreed to a two-year, one-way contract with the Vegas Golden Knights on July 1, 2018. For the duration of his contract with the Golden Knights, McKenzie played in the AHL with the Chicago Wolves.

As a free agent, McKenzie was signed by the St. Louis Blues to a one-year, two-way contract on October 10, 2020. In the pandemic delayed  season, after attending the Blues training camp, McKenzie was assigned to temporary affiliate, the Utica Comets, for the duration of the season and registered 5 goals and 13 points through 26 regular season games.

Leaving the Blues organization as a free agent, McKenzie opted to reunite with the Texas Stars of the AHL, securing a two-year contract on August 6, 2021.

Personal life
McKenzie attended Burnaby Mountain Secondary School in Burnaby, British Columbia.

McKenzie married Lucia Carr in August 2018 and welcomed their first child in February 2021.

While attending Miami University, McKenzie became involved in the You Can Play Project. You Can Play is an initiative to promote equality in sports. In 2016, the NHL adopted its Hockey Is For Everyone night. McKenzie was the Dallas Stars first Ambassador.

Career statistics

Awards and honours

References

External links
 

1991 births
Living people
Canadian ice hockey left wingers
Chicago Wolves players
Dallas Stars draft picks
Dallas Stars players
Ice hockey people from British Columbia
Miami RedHawks men's ice hockey players
Penticton Vees players
People from the Columbia-Shuswap Regional District
Texas Stars players
Utica Comets players